The Browning House is a historic house in Milan, Tennessee. It was built in 1873, and was the childhood home of Gordon Browning, who served as the Governor of Tennessee from 1937 to 1939. In 1941, the house was purchased by the Milan Army Ammunition Plant (MLAAP), and was unused until 1953, when it was restored by Procter and Gamble (the MLAAP's operating contractor) and used as additional office space. It has been listed on the National Register of Historic Places since June 28, 1974.

References

National Register of Historic Places in Gibson County, Tennessee
Houses completed in 1873